Santiago Roque (born 4 October 1966) is a Cuban table tennis player. He competed in the men's singles event at the 1992 Summer Olympics.

References

1966 births
Living people
Cuban male table tennis players
Olympic table tennis players of Cuba
Table tennis players at the 1992 Summer Olympics
Place of birth missing (living people)